Seddon railway station is located on the Werribee and Williamstown lines in Victoria, Australia. It serves the western Melbourne suburb of Seddon, and opened on 10 December 1906.

History

Opening on 10 December 1906, Seddon station, like the suburb itself, was named after Richard John Seddon, who was a worker at the Newport Workshops, a corporal in the artillery at Williamstown, and was Prime Minister of New Zealand between 1893-1906.

The station opened as a double line block post with a signal box, for the control of trains in the section from Footscray to Yarraville. The block post closed in 1912, but automatic signalling was not provided on the section until 1927.

In 1972, both platforms were extended. In 1980, the former timber buildings were demolished and, in 1981, were replaced with the current station buildings.

Platforms and services

Seddon has two side platforms. It is served by Werribee and Williamstown trains.

Platform 1:
  all stations services to Flinders Street and Frankston
  all stations services to Flinders Street and Frankston

Platform 2:
  all stations services to Laverton via Altona (weekdays only); all stations services to Werribee
  all stations services to Williamstown

Gallery

References

External links

 Melway map at street-directory.com.au

Railway stations in Melbourne
Railway stations in Australia opened in 1906
Railway stations in the City of Maribyrnong